Erythrocyanosis crurum is a skin condition, a variant  of acrocyanosis caused by chronic exposure to cold.

See also 
 Chilblains
 List of cutaneous conditions

References

External links 

Skin conditions resulting from physical factors
Diseases of arteries, arterioles and capillaries